Cholon may refer to:

Cholon, Ho Chi Minh City or Chợ Lớn, a Chinatown quarter in Vietnam
Cholón District, a district of Marañón, Peru
Cholón language, also known as Seeptsá and Tsinganeses, a recently extinct language of Peru